Robert Lee Nichols (born November 25, 1944) is an American politician who represents the 3rd District of the Texas Senate. A Republican, he was the Senate President Pro Tempore of the 85th legislative session.

Early years
Nichols graduated in 1968 from Lamar University in Beaumont, Texas, with a degree in industrial engineering. He had a career as a small businessman before being elected mayor of Jacksonville, Texas, and served as mayor 1985-1989.

Public service
During his tenure as mayor, Nichols streamlined the city government and helped to cut property tax rates. His service as Mayor eventually convinced then-Governor of Texas George W. Bush to appoint him to a six-year term on the Texas Transportation Commission in 1997. Nichols was appointed again in 2003 by former Texas Governor Rick Perry, and continued to serve until he resigned to prepare for a bid for the Texas Senate.

2006 and 2018 elections
Nichols faced stiff competition in 2006 from Republicans Bob Reeves of Center; David Kleimann of Willis; and Frank Denton of Conroe in the Republican primary. Nichols secured a 54% win, thus avoiding a runoff. Nichols' primary win was tantamount to winning the general election, as he did not have a Democratic candidate run against him in 2006.

In the general election of November 6, 2018, Nichols defeated the Democrat, Shirley Layton, and the Libertarian Party nominee, Bruce Quarels. Nichols received 214,756 votes (78.3 percent) to Layton's 56,274 (20.5 percent) and Quarles' 3,280 (1.2 percent).

Service outside the Texas Senate

Nichols served as a board member of the now defunct Lon Morris College in Jacksonville, Texas; the now defunct East Texas Medical Center (now University of Texas Health System, East Texas)  and the Nan Travis Hospital Foundation, as chairman of the Jacksonville Economic Development Corporation.

Personal life

Nichols is wed to his high school sweetheart, Donna; they are parents of three children. Nichols is also the son of the co-founder of Nichols Industries, Inc., Talley Nichols, which was one of the largest manufacturers of toy cap guns in the 1940s, 1950s, and 1960s. Nichols is a member of First United Methodist Church in Jacksonville.

Electoral history

2006

References

External links
Senate of Texas - Senator Robert Nichols
Project Vote Smart - Senator Robert Nichols (TX) profile
2006 Follow the Money - campaign contributions

|-

1944 births
21st-century American politicians
Lamar University alumni
Living people
Mayors of places in Texas
People from Jacksonville, Texas
Republican Party Texas state senators
Presidents pro tempore of the Texas Senate